Yo Canto may refer to:
 Yo canto (Julio Iglesias album), a 1969 album by Spanish singer Julio Iglesias
 Io canto, a 2006 album by Italian singer Laura Pausini
 Yo Canto (TV series), a 2011 reality show/singing competition from Puerto Rico